The 1990–91 season was the 111th season of competitive football by Rangers.

Overview
Rangers played a total of 48 competitive matches during the 1990–91 season. The team finished first in the Scottish Premier Division and won the third of their nine league titles in a row.

There was significant transfer activity during the season with England international striker Mark Hateley arriving from Monaco and Terry Butcher departing for Coventry CIty.

Manager Graeme Souness left Rangers to go to Liverpool with just four games left of the season.  The managers job was given to Souness' assistant Walter Smith who managed to lead Rangers to the title, with a 2–0 win over Aberdeen at Ibrox on the last day of the season.

In the cup competitions, they were knocked out of the Scottish Cup at the quarter-finals stage, losing 2–0 to Celtic at Parkhead. Rangers won the Scottish League Cup, defeating Celtic 2–1 AET.

In Europe they were knocked out the European Cup in the second round by Serbian side Red Star Belgrade (Red Star defeated Marseille on penalties in the final). Rangers lost the tie 4–1 on aggregate. They defeated Valletta of Malta 10–0 on aggregate in the first round.

Transfers

In

Out

Results
All results are written with Rangers' score first.

Scottish Premier Division

European Cup

Scottish Cup

League Cup

Appearances

League table

See also
 1990–91 in Scottish football
 1990–91 Scottish Cup
 1990–91 Scottish League Cup
 1990–91 European Cup
Nine in a row

References

Rangers F.C. seasons
Rangers
Scottish football championship-winning seasons